The Kuntilanak (Indonesian name), also called Pontianak (Malay name), is a mythological creature in Indonesia, Malaysia and Singapore. It is similar to Langsuir in other Southeast Asia regions. The Pontianak usually takes the form of a pregnant woman who is unable to give birth to a child. Alternatively, it is often described as a vampiric, vengeful female spirit. Another form of the Pontianak refers to the ghost or white lady of Southeast Asian folklore.

The Pontianak is often depicted as a long-haired woman dressed in white,  and it represents local variations of a vampire. She lures in unsuspecting men to incite fear and enact revenge. Signs that a Pontianak is nearby include the sound of an infant crying and the smell of a decaying corpse or the plumeria flower.

Etymology 
Kuntilanak or Pontianak is often described as an astral female spirit; another version of this figure is a woman spirit with long sharp fangs and fingernails. It is similar to the spirit of a woman unable to give birth while her stillborn child was inside her womb. This figure is mainly known to reside in the Kalimantan region containing the city of Pontianak.

The Pontianak can disguise herself using the appearance of a beautiful woman to lure her prey. In Malaysia, lore depicts them as "vampiric" blood-suckers that rip through the internal organs of men.

The Pontianak is derived from myths and folktales, some of which are particularly popular in Kalimantan (Borneo). Being one of the most famous pieces of Indonesian folklore, it inspired the name of a capital city in the Western Kalimantan region, called Pontianak. The city of Pontianak had a long history, it was founded and infested by ghosts, until Syarif Abdurrahman Alkadrie fended off the ghosts. After the two shots were fired at the exact same spot, then the sultanate had planned to construct the foundation of a mosque and a palace there at the forest. The first sultan of the Pontianak Sultanate, whose reign lasted from 1771-1808, was haunted by these wicked creatures. Today, the place is covered in trees and locals still believe it is haunted by the Pontianak. It is tradition to shoot carbide cannons made from logs to pay tribute to the Sultan.

Physical appearance and behavior

The Kuntilanak (Pontianak) is often depicted as a beautiful woman with pale skin, red eyes, and long black hair. She is often dressed in a blood-smeared white dress. The Kuntilanak is also described as changing into a more monstrous form when she captures her prey which is typically men or helpless people. Because she is bloodthirsty and has a carnivorous nature, a Pontianak can also appear as a beast or a ghost, resembling the Dracula vampire.

Pontianak only appears under the full moon and typically announces her presence with the cries of infants or feminine laughter. It is said that if the sounds are quiet, she is nearby, but if they are loud, she is far away. Some sources also state that a dog howling at night indicates that a Pontianak is present, but not too close; if the dog whines, then a Pontianak is near. Its presence is also said to be heralded by a floral fragrance, identifiable as that of the Plumeria flower, followed by a stench similar to that of a decaying corpse.

The Pontianak kills her victims by using her long fingernails to physically remove their internal organs to be eaten. In cases where the Pontianak desires revenge and retribution against a man, it is said to eviscerate the victim with its hands. If a victim has their eyes open when a Pontianak is near, she will suck them out of their head. The Pontianak is said to locate her prey by the scent of their clean laundry;  because of this, some Malaysians refuse to leave any piece of clothing outside their house overnight.

The Pontianak is associated with banana trees, and her spirit is said to reside in them during the day. According to folklore, a Pontianak can be fought off by driving a nail into the hole on the nape of her neck, which causes her to turn into a beautiful woman and a good wife until the nail is removed.

The Indonesian Kuntilanak is similar to the Pontianak in Malaysia, but commonly takes the form of a bird and sucks the blood of virgins and young women. The bird, which makes a "Ke-ke-ke" sound as it flies, may be sent through black magic to make a woman fall ill 
Suara kuntilanak ketawa / Jurig Jurig
https://www.youtube.com/watch?v=7VWTdzlOMO0
 the characteristic symptom being vaginal bleeding. When a man approaches her in her female form, the Kuntilanak suddenly turns and reveals that her back is hollow, much like the Sundel bolong the prostitute ghost with her large gaping hole on her back. A Kuntilanak can be subdued by plunging a sharp nail into the top of her head.

In popular culture
The Kuntilanak has been portrayed in Indonesian and Malaysian horror films and on Indonesian and Malaysian television.

 Malaysian films:
 Pontianak (1957)
 Dendam Pontianak (1957)
 Sumpah Pontianak (1958)
 Anak Pontianak, also known as The Pontianak Child (1958)
 The Return of Pontianak (1963)
 Pontianak Musang Cave (1964)
 Pontianak (1975)
 Pontianak Harum Sundal Malam (2004)
 Perempuan, Pontianak dan Dot Dot Dot (2004)
 Pontianak Harum Sundal Malam 2 (2005)
 The Scream of Pontianak (2005)
 Anak Pontianak TV Series (2007)
 Ponti Anak Remaja (2009)
 Ponti Anak Remaja Mini Series (2010)
 Help! My Girlfriend Is A Pontianak (2011)
 Pontianak vs Oily Man (2012)
 The Nail of Pontianak (2013)
 Misteri Bisikan Pontianak (2013)
 Pontianak Sesat Dalam Kampung Telemovie (2016)
 Dendam Pontianak (2019)
 Ex Aku Pontianak, also known as My Ex Is A Pontianak (2022)

 Indonesian films:
 Kuntilanak (1962)
 Kuntilanak (1974)
 Lawang Sewu (2007)
 Casablanca Tunnel (Red Kuntilanak) (2007)
 Kuntilanak's Nest (2008)
 Kuntilanak (2006), Kuntilanak 2 (2007), Kuntilanak 3 (2008)
 Kuntilanak's Morgue (2009)
 Kuntilanak Beranak (2009)
 Nail Demon (2009)
 Santet Kuntilanak (2012)
 Kuntilanak (2018)
 Indonesian Video Games:
 DreadOut (2014)
 Pamali: Indonesian Folklore Horror (2018)

 Singaporean films:
 Return of Pontianak, also known as Voodoo Magic (2001)
 Dendam Pontianak, also known as Revenge of the Pontianak (2019)

 Hong Kong films:
 The Demon's Baby (1998)

 Malaysian fiction:
 The House of Aunts (2011) by Zen Cho

 Singaporean fiction:
 Folklore: "Nobody"

 American fiction:
 Supernatural: "Cold Fire"

 Internet Subculture:
 The VTuber Mika Melatika of Nijisanji ID is described in her character lore as a kuntilanak.

See also

References

External links
 Article by Singaporean paranormal investigators about pontianaks
"Pontianaks and the Issue of Verisimilitude in Singaporean Cinema" (requires a login and password) — an essay by Dr. Timothy White of the National University of Singapore about the important role played by 1950s and 1960s horror films in the evolution of Pontianak mythology

 Indonesian legendary creatures
 Malay ghost myth
 Malay folklore
Vampires
Corporeal undead
 Indonesian folklore
 Jinn
 Female legendary creatures
Indonesian ghosts
Stillbirth
 Jinniyyat